"Sticky" is a song by Canadian rapper and singer Drake. It was sent to rhythmic contemporary radio through Republic Records and OVO Sound as the dual lead single from his seventh studio album, Honestly, Nevermind, on June 21, 2022, alongside the single "Massive", which was sent to contemporary hit radio on the same day. Drake wrote the song with producer Gordo and additional producer Ry X. It is one of the two rap songs on the album, along with "Jimmy Cooks"–the rest of the album is mostly deep house. It is also one of two songs on the album with a Baltimore Club sound.

Critical reception
AllMusic reviewer Tim Sendra saw "Sticky" as "the most fun" track on Honestly, Nevermind, describing the song as "pumping [and] Baltimore-influenced". Rolling Stone said that the song was in Drake's familiar rap style, on top of "a deep and thumping beat".

Charts

Weekly charts

Year-end charts

Release history

References

 

2022 songs
2022 singles
Drake (musician) songs
Songs written by Drake (musician)
OVO Sound singles
Republic Records singles
Canadian dance songs